Axel Brauns (born 2 July 1963) is a German writer and filmmaker.

Biography 
Brauns was born in Hamburg, West Germany, and spent the first two years of his life in the quarter Eimsbüttel. In 1965, his family moved to Hamburg-Groß Flottbek. There Brauns went to a kindergarten, an elementary school and a gymnasium, where he did his Abitur at 19 years of age. He then began studying for a degree in Business Administration and Law at the University of Hamburg, but left it in 1984 to focus on writing.

In 2000, Brauns founded a literary salon, and since 2002, he has been working as a tax advisor.

Career as writer and filmmaker 
Brauns wrote an autobiography called Buntschatten und Fledermäuse – Leben in einer anderen Welt (Coloured Shadows and Bats – Living in Another World), which was published in 2002 and describes his childhood and his experiences growing up with autism. He won the Literaturförderpreis der Stadt Hamburg for an excerpt from it, after which Hoffmann und Campe offered to publish it. Coloured Shadows and Bats came out in 2002, and reached the bestseller list of Der Spiegel in the same year. In 2003, Brauns was nominated for the Deutscher Bücherpreis, in the category "Most successful debut".

In 2004, Brauns produced his first feature film, called Tsunami und Steinhaufen. It premiered in 2008.

In September 2004, Brauns's novel Kraniche und Klopfer came out. It tells the story of a fictional girl named Adina Adelung, who lives in a house with her brother and mother. Her mother constantly brings rubbish (to which she is addicted) into her house. Eventually, Adina finds the path for a new life by meeting a woman called Erla Meier, who takes her to see cranes in a natural reserve.

In 2006, Brauns published the detective novel Tag der Jagd.

Writings 
Buntschatten und Fledermäuse – Leben in einer anderen Welt (Coloured Shadows and Bats – Living in Another World). Hoffmann und Campe, 2002, .
Kraniche und Klopfer. Goldmann, 2004, .
Tag der Jagd. Hoffmann und Campe, 2006, .

References 
A portion of this article was translated from the corresponding article in the German Wikipedia.

External links 
 

Wie der Autist Axel Brauns ein Filmemacher wurde – article on Brauns in Die Welt (27 February 2009) 
Erfahrungen eines Autisten (3'43'') – interview with Brauns at Planet Wissen 
„Buntschatten und Fledermäuse“ – six audio extracts from the German original of Braun's Coloured Shadows and Bats, at GEO.de 

1963 births
21st-century German writers
21st-century German male writers
Artists with autism
German autobiographers
Film people from Hamburg
German male non-fiction writers
Living people
People from Eimsbüttel
University of Hamburg alumni